Vitaly Butyrin (May 30, 1947 in Kaunas – October 30, 2020 in Vilnius) was a Soviet and Lithuanian photographer.

References

Soviet photographers
1947 births
2020 deaths